George Morton Wright (23 August 1914 – 26 October 1940) was an Australian rules footballer who played with Hawthorn in the Victorian Football League (VFL).

Family
The son of George Edgar Wright (1883-1954), and Annie May Wright (1888-1936), née Morton, George Morton Wright was born at Mount Gambier, South Australia on 23 August 1914.

He married Lorna Helen Payne (1912-1988), later Mrs. William Beeston Ross, in 1940.

Swimming
Wright had a successful swimming career before playing football.

Football
Initially linked with Geelong's Second XVIII, he was cleared to Hawthorn on 25 May 1938, where he went on to play a single senior game, against Fitzroy, on 13 June 1938, at the Glenferrie Oval.

Death
A fireman, Wright died when the two upper floors and roof of a waste-paper factory collapsed on him while he was fighting a fire -- that had been lit by two boys -- in Collingwood on the night of 26 October 1940.

At the time of his death he had passed all of the tests required to train as a RAAF pilot; but, when the Fire Brigade declared that it would not release him to the RAAF, Wright made an appeal direct to the Victorian Premier, Albert Dunstan, and Wright was waiting to hear the results of the Premier's efforts on his behalf.

Notes

References
 
 Inquest Evidence Referred to Authorities: Death of Two Firemen, The Herald, (Wednesday, 18 December 1940), p.3.
 Paper Store a "Death Trap": Regulations Urged, The Argus, (Thursday, 19 December 1940), p.5.
 Death of Two Firemen: Coroner Critical, The Age, (Thursday, 19 December 1940), p.9.

External links 

1914 births
1940 deaths
Australian rules footballers from South Australia
Hawthorn Football Club players
Accidental deaths in Victoria (Australia)
Deaths from fire